The House Republican Conference is the party caucus for Republicans in the United States House of Representatives. It hosts meetings and is the primary forum for communicating the party's message to members. The Conference produces a daily publication of political analysis under the title Legislative Digest.

The conference has a chair who directs day-to-day operations and who is assisted by an elected vice chair and a secretary. The current chair is Elise Stefanik of New York, who assumed the position after a vote of the House Republican Conference on May 14, 2021. 
Former chairs include Gerald Ford, John Boehner, Mike Pence, John B. Anderson, Dick Cheney, Jack Kemp, J. C. Watts, Deborah D. Pryce, Adam Putnam, Jeb Hensarling, Cathy McMorris Rodgers, and Liz Cheney. As a result of the 2022 elections, the party holds a narrow majority in the House of Representatives in the 118th Congress.

Current hierarchy
Effective with the start of the 118th Congress, the conference leadership is as follows:

Kevin McCarthy (CA) as Speaker of the House (Conference Leader)
Steve Scalise (LA) as House Majority Leader 
Tom Emmer (MN) as House Majority Whip 
Elise Stefanik (NY) as  Chair of the House Republican Conference
Mike Johnson (LA) as Vice Chairman of the House Republican Conference
Lisa McClain (MI) as Secretary of the House Republican Conference
Gary Palmer (AL) as Chair of the House Republican Policy Committee
Richard Hudson (NC) as Chair of the National Republican Congressional Committee
Guy Reschenthaler (PA) as House Republican Chief Deputy Whip

Leaders of the House Republican Conference

Notes

Conference chairs
The conference chair is elected each Congress.

Vice chairs 
The vice chair is next in rank after the House Republican Conference Chair. Like the chair, the vice chair is elected by a vote of all Republican House members before each Congress. Among other duties, the vice chair has a seat on both the Steering and Policy Committees.

 Robert Stafford of Vermont (1971)
 Samuel L. Devine of Ohio (1971–1979)
 Jack Edwards of Alabama (1979–1985)
 Lynn Morley Martin of Illinois (1985–1989)
 Bill McCollum of Florida (1989–1995)
 Susan Molinari of New York (1995–1997)
 Jennifer Dunn of Washington (1997–1999)
 Tillie Fowler of Florida (1999–2001)
 Deborah Pryce of Ohio (2001–2003)
 Jack Kingston of Georgia (2003–2007)
 Kay Granger of Texas (2007–2009)
 Cathy McMorris Rodgers of Washington (2009–2013)
 Lynn Jenkins of Kansas (2013–2017)
 Doug Collins of Georgia (2017–2019)
 Mark Walker of North Carolina (2019–2021)
 Mike Johnson of Louisiana (2021–present)

Secretaries

See also 
 House Democratic Caucus

References

External links
Republican Conference

Republican Conference
Conference, House